Sphingomonas aerolata  is a Gram-negative and psychrotolerant bacteria from the genus of Sphingomonas.

References

Further reading

External links
Type strain of Sphingomonas aerolata at BacDive -  the Bacterial Diversity Metadatabase

aerolata
Bacteria described in 2003